Ralph Izzo is an American businessman and former nuclear physicist. He was the Chairman, President, and CEO of Public Service Enterprise Group, a Fortune 500 energy company headquartered in New Jersey. He is also the Chairman of the Nuclear Energy Institute, a nuclear industry trade association based in Washington, D.C.

Biography 
Growing up during the 1973 Oil Embargo made Izzo interested in fusion energy research because fusion energy was viewed to be the path to steer away from petroleum and fossil based fuels. He then chose to attend Columbia University that a small fusion reactor with a potential for commercialization. He subsequently received his Bachelor of Science (1978) and Master of Science in mechanical engineering (1979) and his doctorate in applied physics (1981), all from Columbia University School of Engineering. At Columbia, he was a pitcher for the school's varsity baseball team.

After receiving his PhD, Izzo began his career by joining the Princeton Plasma Physics Laboratory as a research scientist and worked there from 1981 to 1986. He then worked for Senator Bill Bradley as an American Physical Society Congressional Science Fellow to help shape public policy to secure funding for fusion labs. He also worked for Senator Thomas Kean for four years as a senior science policy advisor and was involved in the construction of the Hope Creek Nuclear Generating Station.

In 1992, he joined the Public Service Enterprise Group (PSEG) as vice president before being promoted to president and chief operating officer of Public Service Electric and Gas Company (PSE&G), an operating subsidiary of PSEG. He received an MBA from Rutgers University, with a concentration in finance, in 2002. He was named president and chief operating officer of the company and was named to the company's board of directors in 2006. In 2007, Izzo was appointed Chairman, and CEO of PSEG.

In June 2010, he was elected chair of Rutgers University's board of governors. In 2011, he was the class day speaker for Fu Foundation School of Engineering and Applied Science at Columbia University.

He has a been a member of the Fusion Energy Sciences Advisory Committee of the United States Department of Energy. From 2013 to 2016, he was a director of Williams Companies. He was also a director, and former chair of the New Jersey Chamber of Commerce, a director of Nuclear Electric Insurance Limited, Edison Electric Institute, and New Jersey Performing Arts Center. In August 2020, he was named a director of BNY Mellon.

Awards and honors 
In 2010, Izzo was honored by the New Jersey Inventors Hall of Fame with its "Trustee Award." In 2012, he was honored by the National Italian American Foundation and received the NIAF Special Achievement Award in Science and Technology.

He serves on the Peddie School board of trustees.

Personal life 
Izzo is married to Karen Izzo, a retired biologist, and lives in Cranbury, New Jersey with his wife, and two kids.

References 

Living people
American chief executives of Fortune 500 companies
Public Service Enterprise Group
Columbia Lions baseball players
Rutgers University alumni
American nuclear physicists
American nuclear engineers
United States Department of Energy National Laboratories personnel
Princeton Plasma Physics Laboratory people
People from Cranbury, New Jersey
BNY Mellon
American people of Italian descent
Year of birth missing (living people)